Rockling is the vernacular name for a variety of fishes:

 Fish of the family Lotidae
 Australian rockling (Genypterus blacodes) from the family Ophidiidae
 Shore rockling (Gaidropsarus mediterraneus) from the family  Gadidae